Silver pine is a common name for several trees and may refer to:

Manoao colensoi, native to New Zealand
Pinus monticola, native to western North America